Carrie Budoff Brown is an American journalist and news editor. She is currently the Senior Vice President of Meet the Press on NBC News.

She is the former editor of Politico. She previously served as the managing editor of Politico Europe and as a White House correspondent at Politico. Prior to joining Politico, she worked as a reporter at The Philadelphia Inquirer and The Hartford Courant.

Biography
Brown grew up in York, Pennsylvania. While attending Central York High School, she interned at the York Daily Record. Brown later attended Rutgers University and graduated in 1998. She interned at The New York Times for one and a half years. She was a recipient of the 2012 Merriman Smith Memorial Award for Excellence in Presidential Coverage under pressure.

In November 2016, she was named editor of Politico after several co-founders left to start a rival, Axios. In her new role, Budoff Brown oversaw investigations and stories that helped the publication "get its groove back" in 2017, according to Washingtonian. She was later named one of "The 50 Most Powerful People In Trump's Washington" by GQ and as one of "The Most Powerful Women in Washington" by Washingtonian. 

Budoff Brown in 2021 moved to NBC News where her "new role is often akin to an unofficial managing editor of NBC News Digital," and she recruited former colleagues from Politico, sparking a legal threat, according to the Daily Beast.

References

External links
 

Living people
Rutgers University alumni
American political journalists
People from York, Pennsylvania
21st-century American journalists
21st-century American women writers
American women journalists
The Philadelphia Inquirer people
Hartford Courant people
Year of birth missing (living people)